Pratham Swatantrata Sangram Express is a mail/express train service operated by Indian Railways, connecting Kolkata With Jhansi Junction. It was first introduced between Barrackpore and Jhansi, commemorating the first independence movement of India, which started in two places by Mangal Pandey and Rani Laxmi Bai. Later it started departing from Kolkata Railway Station instead of Barrackpore. It covers 1326 kilometers at an average speed of 55 km/h, and is usually hauled by WAM 4 class of locomotives. The train has LHB coach. AC three tier, sleeper and general classes are available in it; it has no Pantry car service, but Tatkal scheme is available.  All the classes except general require prior reservations.
It leaves Kolkata Railway Station at 7:25 every Sunday, and reaches Jhansi Junction at 9:00 the following morning;
it departs Jhansi Junction at 21:05 on Fridays and reaches Kolkata Railway station at 22:00 the following evening.

Important stopping points
 Kolkata Railway Station
 Barrackpore
 Burdwan
 Asansol Jn.
 Jhajha
 Patna jn.
 Mughalsarai
 Allahabad Jn.
 Kanpur Central
 Jhansi Jn.

Schedule

RSA - Rake Sharing

11103/11104 - Jhansi - Bandra Terminus Express

External links
 Indian Rail site

Named passenger trains of India
Rail transport in Bihar
Rail transport in Jharkhand
Rail transport in West Bengal
Trains from Jhansi
Transport in Kolkata
Railway services introduced in 2007
Express trains in India